Deshon Ka Sartaj Bharat ("India, Crown of the World") is a march played by the military of India, primarily the Indian Army. It was composed by J.N. Roy Choudhary, who was an instructor of music at the Military Music Wing, Army Education Corps Centre & College, Pachmarhi, Madhya Pradesh.

This march has been arranged for both full military band and pipe band.

See also

 India related
 Band of the Brigade of Gurkhas
 Beating retreat in India 
 Indian military bands
 Indian Army Chief's Band
 Military Music Wing
 Music of India
 President's Bodyguard
 Tri-Services Guard of Honour (India)
 Samman Guard

 Other related
 Guard of honour

References

External links 
Deshon Ka Sartaj, Bharat by the Maratha Light Infantry Band

Indian military marches
Indian Army
Year of song missing